The Ters is a river in Ala-Buka District of Jalal-Abad Region of Kyrgyzstan. It rises on northern slopes of Chatkal Range and flows into Chatkal.
It is fed by majorly snow and rainwater and by springs.

References

Rivers of Kyrgyzstan